Muromtsev (from Муромец meaning citizen of Murom) is a Russian masculine surname, its feminine counterpart is Muromtseva. It may refer to
Sergey Muromtsev (1850–1910), Russian lawyer
Muromtsev Dacha, built in 1893 by Sergey Muromtsev

Russian-language surnames